Herräng Dance Camp (commonly abbreviated HDC, officially Herräng Dance Camp Aktiebolag) is the largest annual dance camp that focuses on Lindy Hop, boogie woogie, Tap dance, jazz dance, and balboa. It is held for 5 weeks annually from late June through July in Herräng, Sweden and focuses both on instruction and dancing.

Swing era dancers including Frankie Manning, Norma Miller, Chazz Young, and Dawn Hampton presented at the camp.

With over 750 people attending each week compared to a population of the village of Herräng of between 400 and 600, the camp assembles a significant amount of infrastructure each summer to meet the needs of the large number of dancers. Some of the most noticeable additions to Herräng during Herräng Dance Camp includes several cafes; a full cafeteria serving buffet-style meals; a shop for dance supplies, accessories and daily essentials; bicycle rental; housing of various standards; and nightly entertainment.

The camp is owned and run by Lorenz Ilg, Frida Segerdahl, Fatima Teffahi, Daniel Heedman, and Lennart Westerlund.

History
The first Herräng Dance Camp was held for one week, starting on 1 August 1982, and was organized by the Swedish Swing Society, a swing dance organization based in Stockholm, Sweden. It was attended by around 25 participants and was entirely taught by John Clancy from New York. Attendance increased to nearly 100 students in its second year. For the following five years, the camp grew in popularity in and around Sweden, and was only attended by Swedish dancers.

During the swing revival in the late 1980s, the camp began to gain international attention. In 1989, two separate camps were organized in Herräng, one by The Rhythm Hot Shots and another by the traditional organizers, the Swedish Swing Society.

For the 1989 camp organized by The Rhythm Hot Shots, Frankie Manning, a surviving member of the swing era, was invited to teach at the camp.

The competing dance camps were held for five years, until 1994, when the two groups held the first unified Herräng Dance Camp.

During the 1990s, the camp gained greater international attention, beginning to attract many dancers from countries outside of Sweden and Europe.

The camp almost went bankrupt in 2003; at that time it was taken over by its current ownership. In 2020 the camp was cancelled due to COVID-19 pandemic.

References

External links

Lindy Hop
Dance festivals in Sweden
Music festivals in Sweden